Hero is a 1985 Pakistani action film starring Waheed Murad, Babra Sharif, Mumtaz, Aslam Pervaiz, Saqi, Adil Murad (as child star & guest star) and Nadeem (as guest star). It was produced by Waheed himself and directed by his close friend Iqbal Yousuf. Waheed Murad died leaving this film incomplete. It was later completed by Iqbal Yousuf using 'cheat shot' techniques and released after two years of Waheed's death on 11 January 1985 countrywide.

In those days, Waheed Murad was in trouble and was being cast in either supporting roles or being offered by 'B-class' film directors. So he decided to produce his own film and chose his best friend Iqbal Yousuf as film director. The script and story was written by Waheed himself. Waheed's expectations were high for this film, as he once said in an interview in Anwar Maqsood's programme 'Silver Jubilee':

Synopsis 
Hero is a romantic and action movie. Waheed Murad played double role in this film. It is based on a story of two different persons but with similar faces, one is very innocent and the other is a gangster.

Cast
 Babra Sharif
 Waheed Murad
 Mumtaz
 Adil Murad
 Munawar Saeed
 Tani
 Huma Dar
 Seema
 Saqi
 Khalid Saleem Mota
 Chakram
 Hanif
 Jahangir Mughal
 (Guests: Talish, Lehri, Aslam Parvez, Ilyas Kashmiri, Shahid, Ali Ejaz, Nadeem)

Release 
Hero was released on 11 January 1985, i.e., after two years of Waheed Murad's death. The film was released on Lyric Cinema of Karachi and Firdous Cinema of Hyderabad. The film had average success and completed 35 weeks on cinemas with 5 weeks on main cinemas and thus became a Silver Jubilee film.

Filming 
During those days, Waheed Murad was depressed, frustrated and suffered from his illness. He had to undergo for a stomach removal surgery. After surgery, he recovered, but lost significant amount of weight, which could be seen in Hero. Babra Sharif revealed that during filming of a scene of Hero, Waheed lost his balance while walking briskly toward her and fell down. He took several minutes to catch his breath prior to standing up on his feet again. In July 1983, Waheed also had a car accident, which left a large scar on his face. He moved to Karachi to get the scar fixed (plastic surgery) in order to complete the last few scenes of Hero, but died one day before his surgery.

Music 
The music of the film was composed by Kamal Ahmed with Tasleem Fazli and Khwaja Pervaiz as lyricist. Ahmed Rushdi, Noor Jehan, Mehdi Hassan and Mehnaz were the lead singers. The songs are:

Ban ke misra ghazal ka... by Ahmed Rushdi
Yeh Dunya Pyar Ki ... by Mehnaz
Woh Nain Suhagan Hote Hain ... by Mehnaz
Mil gaye ho tum... by Mehnaz
Main tujh ko kya bataoon... by Noor Jehan
Tere jalwon ki dhoop chhaon ne... by Mehdi Hassan

References

External links 
 

1985 films
1985 action films
Pakistani action films
1980s Urdu-language films
Urdu-language Pakistani films